Gandara is a village in the Matara District on the southern coast of Sri Lanka,  from Colombo. It is an important village in Matara. It was slightly affected by the Asian tsunami in December 2004.

History
Historically, Gandara belongs to the area called Ruhuna, one of the three kingdoms in Sri Lanka (Thun Sinhalaya). The temple in the village was built by ancient kings and now is a popular sacred place among Buddhists in the area. The mosque in the village was built by villagers in the late 1840s.

Polling division
 Devinuwara

Education

Schools
 Gandara Maha Vidyalaya
 Gandara kanitu Viduhala
 Al Azhar Muslim Kanista Vidyalaya, established in 1938.

Places of Worship
 Purana Viharaya, Gandara 
 Wijerathnaramaya Temple, Gandara
 Abayasekararamaya Temple, Gandara
 Sri Jayabodhi Viharaya, Gandara
 Muhiyaddeen Jumma Mosque

Transport 
Gandara is on the Matara – Kataragama main road, which is served by the A32 highway.

See also
 Railway stations in Sri Lanka

References

External links
 Matara in Sri Lankan Village Directory
 History of Matara City
 District Secretariat – Matara

Populated places in Southern Province, Sri Lanka
Populated places in Matara District
Suburbs of Matara, Sri Lanka